Jakkit Palapon (born 1 July 1999) is a Thai professional footballer who plays as a winger for Thai League 1 club Khon Kaen United.

International career
In October 2021, Jakkit was called up to the Thailand U-23 national team for the 2022 AFC U-23 Asian Cup qualification phase. He also played at the final tournament.

International goals

Under-23

Honours

International
Thailand U-23
 Southeast Asian Games  Silver Medal: 2021

References

External links
 

1999 births
Jakkit Palapon
Living people
Jakkit Palapon
Association football forwards
Jakkit Palapon
Competitors at the 2021 Southeast Asian Games
Jakkit Palapon